Douglas Powers, commonly known as Dr. Evil, is a fictional character portrayed by Mike Myers in the Austin Powers film series. He is the main antagonist and Austin Powers' nemesis (and secret twin brother). He is a parody of James Bond villains, primarily Ernst Stavro Blofeld. Dr. Evil routinely hatches schemes to terrorize and take over the world, and is usually accompanied by "Number Two", a goon who fronts his evil corporation Virtucon Industries, his cat Mr. Bigglesworth and his sidekick Mini-Me, a dwarf clone of himself.

American costume maker Phillip Morris had also created a long-running character named Dr. Evil in 1959. After an eight-year legal battle, New Line Cinema paid him a settlement in response to a trademark dispute.

Character background
In 1997, an unnamed Saturday Night Live writer claimed Dr. Evil was based on SNL creator Lorne Michaels, saying: "It's the lower lip, the eyebrows, the whole way he talks." Another unnamed former SNL actor cited Michaels' "obsessing about minutiae, the way he ends everything by bringing his pinkie up and chewing the fingernail." Mike Myers disagreed, insisting the character was based on Donald Pleasence's portrayal of Bond villain Ernst Stavro Blofeld in You Only Live Twice.

In the first film, Austin Powers: International Man of Mystery, Dr. Evil is an internationally known criminal genius, cryogenically frozen in 1967 and reawakened in 1997. According to his own account, Dr. Evil's upbringing went as follows:

In the second film, he went on the Jerry Springer show and declared that he was the "Princess of Canada". 

In the third film, Goldmember, Nigel Powers reveals that Dr. Evil is in fact Austin Powers' twin brother, Douglas "Dougie" Powers. He explains that Douglas and Austin were separated as babies following a car explosion, and that he had thought that only Austin had survived. Following the explosion, Dougie was raised in Bruges, Belgium.

Relationships with other characters

Scott Evil 
Dr. Evil has a strained relationship with his son Scott (played by Seth Green), even liquidating their therapy group over an accusation of insolence. Scott points out Dr. Evil's incompetence and immaturity, as well as obvious mistakes and flaws in his plans. Scott later grows more "evil" and momentarily gains his father's respect, especially after Scott provides him a pool filled with sharks with laser-beams attached to their heads. When Dr. Evil switches sides to help Austin save the world, Scott takes over as the head of the evil organization.

Mr. Bigglesworth

Mr. Bigglesworth (played by Ted Nude Gent) is a fictional cat belonging to Dr. Evil. He was originally similar to Blofeld's cat, a typical white Persian cat from the James Bond movie series. Having escaped with Dr. Evil in a cryonic capsule, he lost all his fur due to an error in the thawing process. Mr. Bigglesworth has subsequently become bald, played by a Sphynx cat, whilst Dr. Evil's miniature clone, Mini-Me, has a kitten named Mini Mr. Bigglesworth. In the third installment of the franchise, Mr. Bigglesworth is only seen once.

Minions 
Dr. Evil employs a diverse and highly stereotypical group of minions.

 His personal assistant Frau Farbissina (played by Mindy Sterling) is the founder of the militant wing of The Salvation Army. ("Farbissina" is Yiddish for "embittered".) In the second film, Austin Powers: The Spy Who Shagged Me, after imbibing some of Austin Powers' mojo, Dr. Evil becomes temporarily irresistible to Frau Farbissina, who is portrayed as a lesbian. In Goldmember, Farbissina and Dr. Evil kiss while he is in prison; the purpose was to transfer a key to Evil so that he could escape.
 Number Two (played by Robert Wagner, while the young Number Two is portrayed by Rob Lowe) leads Dr. Evil's industrial empire Virtucon and is primarily concerned with the financial aspects of world domination. In successive films, his schemes and ventures garner massive profits for Virtucon without straying very far into illegality. 
 Fat Bastard (also portrayed by Mike Myers) is a morbidly obese henchman hailing from Scotland, said to weigh a metric ton. His extreme size endows Fat Bastard with super-human strength. Fat Bastard is noted for his foul temper, frequent flatulence, vulgar manners, and cannibalism. Fat Bastard reappears at the end of Austin Powers in Goldmember, having lost most of his girth and attributing the loss to the "Subway diet".
 Random Task is an ex-wrestler whose personality and assassination style parody those of Oddjob from Goldfinger, except that he throws his shoe instead of his hat.
 Paddy O'Brien is an ex-assassin who is extremely superstitious, leaving a keepsake from his good-luck charm bracelet on the body of every victim he kills. Apparently Scotland Yard has been trying to recover that bracelet for some time. 
 Mustafa (played by Will Ferrell) designs the cryogenic freezing process that preserves Dr. Evil for 30 years.
 The second film introduces Dr. Evil's clone Mini-Me (played by Verne Troyer) who is "one-eighth his size but twice as evil." Dr. Evil considers him more of a real son than Scott, provoking the latter's jealousy. Mini-Me later joins Austin to become a miniature version of him. As revealed by Myers in the audio commentary for the 2nd film, Mini-Me is a parody of the character Majai, from the film The Island of Dr. Moreau, as played by Nelson de la Rosa, whose sole purpose in that film is to follow Marlon Brando's Dr. Moreau character and copy his every move, dressing identically to Brando. Majai never speaks in the film, and similarly, Mini-Me does not speak either.

In television
Myers later revived the Dr. Evil character for a brief appearance on the December 20, 2014 episode of Saturday Night Live, a show on which Myers had previously had a regular role. During the sketch, Dr. Evil lampooned North Korea and Sony Pictures on their spat over The Interview. Myers once again revived the character for a brief appearance on a 2018 episode of The Tonight Show Starring Jimmy Fallon in  a sketch where Dr. Evil has been fired from President Trump's cabinet, and again on Election Day to announce his run for Congress.

Myers subsequently played Dr. Evil in a Super Bowl LVI commercial, for General Motors. Seth Green, Rob Lowe, and Mindy Sterling also reprised their roles as Scott Evil, Number Two, and Frau Farbissina.  In the commercial, Dr. Evil along with his henchmen take over General Motors, but his henchmen tell him that climate change is the biggest threat of the planet, making Dr. Evil the second threat on the planet. So, Evil decides he and his henchmen will save the planet, with the lineup of the company's electric vehicles. Scott Evil also informs his father he has a grandson named Kyle (but Dr. Evil names him Baby Me.)

References

Austin Powers characters
Fictional physicians
Fictional mad scientists
Fictional mass murderers
Adoptee characters in films
Fictional cryonically preserved characters
Time travelers
Fictional twins
Fictional Belgian people
Fictional French people
Fictional scientists in films
Film characters introduced in 1997
Fictional terrorists
Male film villains
Film supervillains